A Big Fix: Radical Solutions for Australia's Environmental Crisis is a 2005 book by Ian Lowe which argues that the warnings from environmental scientists are urgent and unequivocal. Professor Lowe suggests that resources are being used too quickly, environmental systems are being compromised, and society is being destabilised by the increasing gap between rich and poor. Lowe proposes several radical solutions. He advocates a fundamental change to our personal values and social institutions and provides a vision of a healthier society – one that is more humane, takes an eco-centric approach, adopts longer-term thinking, and respects natural systems.

See also
List of Australian environmental books

References

Australian non-fiction books
Environment of Australia
Environmental non-fiction books
2005 non-fiction books
2005 in the environment
Climate change books
Books by Ian Lowe